Christopher David Rogers (born 10 October 1956 in Fort Victoria, Rhodesia, now Masvingo, Zimbabwe) is a former South African rugby union player.

Playing career

Rogers made his provincial debut for Rhodesia (now Zimbabwe) in the South African Currie Cup competition. In the 1980s he relocated to Transvaal, and in 1984 he made his debut for the Springboks against the touring England team at the Boet Erasmus Stadium in Port Elizabeth. Rogers played in all four tests for the Springboks in 1984, the last against the South American Jaguars at Newlands in Cape Town.

Test history

See also
List of South Africa national rugby union players – Springbok no. 534

References

1956 births
Living people
South African rugby union players
South Africa international rugby union players
Golden Lions players
People from Masvingo
Rhodesian rugby union players
Rugby union hookers